Ludovic Millet (born September 1, 1985) is a French Savate kickboxer, famous for his boxing skills. He is French Champion in Savate and kickboxing and he is the World Kickboxing Network (W.K.N.) World Full Contact Champion.

Biography and career

Biography 
Ludovic Millet, 25 years old, is French Savate and Kickboxing Elite Champion and the W.K.N. World Full Contact Champion. He is an elite athlete, but also a person with many qualities, particularly endearing.

Millet resides in Meaux, France, and trains at CS Meaux AP. His trainer is Abderaman Hamouri. He shares his time between training and working as an educator/sports instructor in his hometown. In 2011 he won two important French tournaments in K-1 Rules.

He challenged Yasuhiro Kido for his Krush -70 kg title at Krush.23 on October 8, 2012 in Tokyo, and lost via unanimous decision (30-26, 30-26, 30-26).

He defended his ISKA World Super Welterweight (-69.5 kg/153.2 lb) Oriental Championship against Johann Fauveau in Meaux, France, on January 19, 2013, winning on points.

He lost to Philippe Salmon on points at FK-ONE in Paris, France, on April 20, 2013.

Titles and achievements

Professional
 2012 K1 ISKA World Champion (70 kg)
 2011 Explosion Fight Night Volume 04 Tournament Champion (71 kg)
 2011 Young Guns 2 Tournament Champion (71 kg)
 2010 W.K.N. World Full Contact Champion (72.600 kg)
 2009 Savate World Champion (70 kg)
 2009 French Savate Elite Champion
 2008 K1 Survivor Tournament Runner Up
 2008 Savate European Champion
 2008 French Savate Elite Champion
 2006 French Kickboxing Class A Champion

Amateur
2006 W.A.K.O. European Championships in Skopje, Macedonia  -71 kg (Low-Kick)

Kickboxing record

|-  bgcolor="#FFBBBB"
| 2017-11-11 || Loss ||align=left| Aziz Kallah || Enfusion Live 55  Final 16|| Amsterdam || TKO  || 3 ||
|-  bgcolor="#FFBBBB"
| 2017-10-19 || Loss ||align=left| Vlad Tuinov  || Partouche Kickboxing Tour -72 kg Tournament Semi Finals || France || KO (Punches) || 1 || 2:27
|-
|-  bgcolor="#FFBBBB"
| 2013-04-20 || Loss ||align=left| Philippe Salmon || FK-ONE || Paris, France || Decision || 3 || 3:00
|-
|-  style="background:#CCFFCC"
| 2013-01-19 || Win ||align=left| Johann Fauveau || || Meaux, France || Decision || 5 || 3:00
|-
! style=background:white colspan=9 |
|-
|-  bgcolor="#CCFFCC"
| 2012-12 || Win ||align=left| Kevin Suzanne || La Nuit Du Kickboxing  || Saint-Jean-de-Braye, France || KO || 2 || 
|-
|-  bgcolor="#FFBBBB"
| 2012-10-08 || Loss ||align=left| Yasuhiro Kido || Krush.23 || Tokyo, Japan || Decision (unanimous) || 3 || 3:00
|-
|-  bgcolor="#FFBBBB"
| 2012-04-28 || Loss ||align=left| Bakari Tounkara || Gala international de boxe thaï & K1 rules || Bagnolet, France || TKO (Doctor Stoppage) || 3 || 
|-
|-  style="background:#CCFFCC"
| 2012-01-21 || Win ||align=left| Tim Thomas || Championnat du Monde ISKA || Meaux, France || Decision || 5 || 3:00
|-
! style=background:white colspan=9 |
|-
|-  style="background:#CCFFCC"
| 2011-12-07 || Win ||align=left| Frederic Berichon || A-1 World Combat Cup || Lyon, France || Decision || || 
|-
|-  bgcolor="#FFBBBB"
| 2011-11-12 || Loss ||align=left| Bruce Codron || La 18ème Nuit des Champions || Marseille, France || Decision || 7 || 2:00
|-
! style=background:white colspan=9 |
|-
|-  style="background:#CCFFCC"
| 2011-06-04 || Win ||align=left| Aziz Ali-Kada || Explosion Fight Night Volume 04 Tournament, Final || Saint-Fons, France || Decision (Majority) || 3 || 3:00
|-
! style=background:white colspan=9 |
|-
|-  style="background:#CCFFCC"
| 2011-06-04 || Win ||align=left| Hichem Chaïbi || Explosion Fight Night Volume 04 Tournament, Semi Final || Saint-Fons, France || Decision (Majority) || 3 || 3:00
|-
|-  style="background:#FFBBBB"
| 2011-04-30 || Loss ||align=left| Moussa Konaté || 8 Men 73 kg Tournament, Semi Final || Bagnolet, France || KO || 2 || 
|-
|-  style="background:#CCFFCC"
| 2011-04-30 || Win ||align=left| Sen Bunthen || 8 Men 73 kg Tournament, Quarter Final || Bagnolet, France || Decision || 3 || 3:00
|-
|-  style="background:#CCFFCC"
| 2011-04-08 || Win ||align=left| Anthony Frémont || Savate Boxing 7 || Marseilles, France || KO (Liver Shot) || 4 || 
|-
|-  style="background:#CCFFCC"
| 2011-03-12 || Win ||align=left| Maxim Shalnev || 8ème Nuit des Champions - Full Contact || Dinard, France || Decision ||  || 
|-
|-  style="background:#CCFFCC"
| 2011-02-26 || Win ||align=left| Ahmed Hassan || Young Guns 2 Tournament, Final || Houplines, France || Decision (Unanimous) || 3 || 3:00
|-
! style=background:white colspan=9 |
|-
|-  style="background:#CCFFCC"
| 2011-02-26 || Win ||align=left| Hamza Rahmani || Young Guns 2 Tournament, Semi Final || Houplines, France || Decision || 3 || 3:00
|-
|-  style="background:#CCFFCC"
| 2010-12-11 || Win ||align=left| Eric Schmitt || Full Night 4 || Agde, France || TKO (Referee Stoppage) || 9 || 
|-
! style=background:white colspan=9 |
|-
|-  style="background:#CCFFCC"
| 2010-10-09 || Win ||align=left| Jeremy Sportouch || TK2 World Max 2010 || Aix-en-Provence, France || Decision || 3 || 3:00
|-
|-  bgcolor="#FFBBBB"
| 2010-06-19 || Loss ||align=left| Kem Sitsongpeenong || Explosion Fight Night Volume 01, Semi Final || Brest, France || Decision (Unanimous) || 3 || 3:00
|-
|-  bgcolor="#FFBBBB"
| 2010–06-04 || Loss ||align=left| Frane Radnić || Nitrianska Noc Bojovnikov - Ring of Honor  || Nitra, Slovakia || TKO || 2 || 
|-
|-  style="background:#CCFFCC"
| 2010-05-08 || Win ||align=left| Eddy Blaise || Seine et Marne vs Paca || Nanteuil-lès-Meaux, France ||  ||  || 
|-
|-  style="background:#CCFFCC"
| 2010-04-24 || Win ||align=left| Kévin Hass || La Nuit des Titans || Saint-André-les-Vergers, France || Decision || 5 || 2:00
|-
|-  bgcolor="#FFBBBB"
| 2010-03-13 || Loss ||align=left| Cédric Flament || 7ème Trophée de l’Ephèbe || Bagnolet, France || Decision || 5 || 3:00
|-
|-  style="background:#CCFFCC"
| 2010-02-06 || Win ||align=left| Thierry Lallemand || UKC France MAX 2010 || Dijon, France || KO || 1 || 
|-
|-  style="background:#CCFFCC"
| 2009-12-12 || Win ||align=left| Roberto Beta || Savate World Championship || La Motte-Servolex, France || Decision ||  || 
|-
! style=background:white colspan=9 |
|-
|-  style="background:#CCFFCC"
| 2009-05-23 || Win ||align=left| Georgy Fernante || French Savate Championships, Final || Paris, France || Decision (Majority) ||  || 
|-
! style=background:white colspan=9 |
|-
|-  style="background:#CCFFCC"
| 2009-01-31 || Win ||align=left| Sadio Sissoko || La Nuit des Titans 2009 || Tours, France || Decision || 5 || 3:00
|-
|-  style="background:#FFBBBB"
| 2008-12-20 || Loss ||align=left| Jonathan Camara || K1 Survivor Tournament, Final || Paris, France || KO || 1 || 
|-
! style=background:white colspan=9 |
|-
|-  style="background:#CCFFCC"
| 2008-12-20 || Win ||align=left| Carlos Tavares || K1 Survivor Tournament, Semi Final || Paris, France || Decision || 3 || 3:00
|-
|-  style="background:#CCFFCC"
| 2008-12-20 || Win ||align=left| Richard Antoine || K1 Survivor Tournament, Quarter Final || Paris, France || Decision (Unanimous) || 3 || 3:00
|-
|-  style="background:#CCFFCC"
| 2008-11-07 || Win ||align=left| Pedrag Darijevic || Savate European Championship || Meaux, France || KO || 3 || 
|-
! style=background:white colspan=9 |
|-
|-  style="background:#CCFFCC"
| 2008-05-17 || Win ||align=left| Georgy Fernante || French Savate Championships, Final || Mulhouse, France || Decision (Unanimous) ||  || 
|-
! style=background:white colspan=9 |
|-
|-  style="background:#CCFFCC"
| 2008-02-02 || Win ||align=left| Marouan Aatifi || French Savate Championships, Final 8 || Paris, France || Decision ||  || 
|-  style="background:#CCFFCC"
| 2008-01-05 || Win ||align=left| Georgy Fernante || French Savate Championships || Paris, France || Decision || 5 || 2:00
|-
|-  style="background:#CCFFCC"
| 2007-03-11 || Win ||align=left| Sebastien Ornecipé || French Savate Championships Class B, Final || Paris, France || KO || 3 || 
|-
|-  style="background:#CCFFCC"
| 2006-04-00 || Win ||align=left| Sadio Sissoko || French Kickboxing Championships, Final || Paris, France || Decision ||  || 
|-
! style=background:white colspan=9 |
|-
|-
| colspan=9 | Legend:

See also 
List of male kickboxers

References

External links
Ludovic Millet Interview

Living people
French male kickboxers
French Muay Thai practitioners
French savateurs
1985 births